UFC 133: Evans vs. Ortiz was a mixed martial arts event held by the Ultimate Fighting Championship on August 6, 2011, at the Wells Fargo Center in Philadelphia, Pennsylvania, United States.

Background
Multiple fighters that were expected to fight at this event suffered injuries. This led to multiple fights, including championship bouts being called off as a result.

This event was expected to feature Light Heavyweight Champion Jon Jones' first title defense against former Light Heavyweight Champion Rashad Evans, but a pre-existing injury in his right hand prevented Jones from fighting, and was expected to keep him sidelined until late 2011.  Not willing to wait, Evans accepted a fight against Phil Davis at this event. However, Jones later found out that he would no longer require surgery and instead made his first title defense against Quinton Jackson on September 24, 2011, at UFC 135.

On July 12, Phil Davis pulled out of his main event bout with Rashad Evans due to a knee injury suffered during training.  Tito Ortiz initially declined an offer to step in as Davis' replacement and Evans was then rumored to face Lyoto Machida in a rematch of their title bout at UFC 98. Machida's camp verbally accepted the fight, but when UFC President Dana White called Machida's camp again to confirm the fight, they said Machida would fight only if he received higher pay, which White declined. The organization briefly turned their attention to matching Evans with Vladimir Matyushenko, who was already scheduled to compete on the card.  In the meanwhile, Ortiz had a change of heart and accepted the offer to replace Davis. The Evans/Davis bout was later rescheduled for UFC on Fox 2 on January 28, 2012.

Nick Pace was originally slated to take on Michael McDonald at this event, before McDonald was pulled to replace Norifumi Yamamoto for a UFC 130 bout with Chris Cariaso. Ivan Menjivar would later step in to face Pace at this event. At the official weigh ins on August 5, Menjivar could not make the 136 pound weight allowance cut off, and Pace subsequently agreed to fight Menjivar in a 138-pound catchweight bout.

A bout between Featherweight Champion José Aldo and Chad Mendes was previously linked to this event. However, Aldo was sidelined until October recovering from various injuries, while Mendes remained on the card and faced Rani Yahya. The Aldo/Mendes title fight would later take place at UFC 142 on January 14, 2012.

Riki Fukuda was scheduled to face Rafael Natal, but was forced out of the bout due to a knee injury suffered sustained in a car accident and was replaced by Costas Philippou. However, Philippou was later pulled from this bout to replace Alessio Sakara in a bout with Jorge Rivera on this same card, and he was replaced by Paul Bradley.

Vladimir Matyushenko was originally scheduled to face Alexander Gustafsson at this event.  Matyushenko, however, pulled out of the bout on July 13, 2011, due to an injury and was replaced by Matt Hamill. The Matyushenko/Gustafsson bout was rescheduled for UFC 141 on December 30, 2011.

Antônio Rogério Nogueira was expected to face Rich Franklin at this event, but Nogueira pulled out of the bout on July 16, 2011, citing a shoulder injury.  Franklin was then pulled from the card as well.

Jorge Rivera was originally scheduled to face Alessio Sakara.  However, on July 25, Rivera announced that Sakara was no longer in the fight due to a torn ACL. The UFC announced that Costas Philippou would be pulled from his bout with Rafael Natal and instead faced Rivera.

UFC 133 featured two preliminary fights live on Spike TV.

Results

Bonus awards
Fighters were awarded $70,000 bonuses

 Fight of the Night: Rashad Evans vs. Tito Ortiz
 Knockout of the Night: Vitor Belfort
 Submission of the Night: Not awarded as no matches ended by submission.
^Brian Ebersole was awarded an honorary "getting those horrifying shorts off TV as soon as possible" bonus by Dana White for defeating Dennis Hallman in the first round.

References

External links
Official UFC 133 Fight Card

Ultimate Fighting Championship events
2011 in mixed martial arts
Mixed martial arts in Pennsylvania
Sports competitions in Philadelphia
2011 in sports in Pennsylvania
Events in Philadelphia